The siege of Auximus (also called Siege of Auximum or Siege of Osimo) was a siege during Justinian’s Gothic War which took place in the year 539. It ended with the Belisarius’ Byzantine force victorious. The Gothic garrison surrendered the town and joined the Byzantines after negotiations. The siege lasted 7 months.

Prelude
 In 535 the Byzantine Eastern Romans had invaded the Ostrogothic Kingdom. The commanders Belisarius, Mundus and Constantinianus had made swift gains, conquering southern Italy, Sicily, Dalmatia and Illyria. The Goths, having paid the Franks for assistance, then moved against the Byzantine force in Rome with superior numbers. The siege was a Byzantine victory. While the Goths with the help of Burgundian personnel send by the Franks were able to somewhat stabilise the situation the Byzantines were still gaining territory. The Franks were not able to send any actually Frankish personnel as they were also allied to the Byzantines. When the commander Narses was sent to Belisarius assistance with reinforcements political intrigue began taking hold of the campaign. Eventually Narses was sent back and Belisarius prepared to move against Ravenna. 

Guarding the way to Ravenna was Auximus, a strongly fortified town atop a hill with a 10,000 strong garrison consisting of some of the most effective Gothic troops. The garrison had been reduced in the summer of 538, when Vacimus borrowed troops from it for his attack on Ancona, defended by the Byzantine general Konon. Although victorious in battle, he failed to take the city. It is unknown if he subsequently returned to Auximum.

The king of the Ostrogoths, Witigis, had seen the importance of the town and sent them there to delay the attack on Ravenna which was why it had such a strong garrison. Belisarius had prepared a large force of 11,000 troops to overwhelm the garrison. Just before the siege started the garrison sent out a foraging party to gather supplies. At the same time Belisarius sent his subordinates Cyprian and Justinus to besiege Fisula.

Siege
Somewhere in May or April of 539 Belisarius arrived at the city. The Byzantines began encircling the city by building camps around it. Seeing them in disorder the Goths sallied out somewhere in the late afternoon but after heavy fighting they were forced back into the city. By now the foraging Goths who had been sent out of the city the previous day returned, some managed to sneak through the Byzantine lines but most were killed. Seeing the strength of the fortifications Belisarius decided not to take the city by storm but instead starve the defenders out.

Tightening the Siege
Every day the Goths would leave the safety or the city to get grass for the horses from a patch of lush grass just in front of the wall. Noticing this the Byzantines tried to prevent this from happening. Consequently, a daily battle took place between the Goths trying to forage for grass and the Byzantines trying to prevent them from foraging. Noticing ravines in that area the Goths deployed troops in an ambush. Sending out the foraging party out as usually they charged the Byzantines from the rear when they moved to attack the party. This worked multiple times and allowed the Goths to forage in peace after the Byzantines were repulsed. The sound the Goths made during the fighting was so loud that the Byzantines in the camp could not hear their comrade's calls for help. Procopius suggested to Belisarius that the cavalry trumpets could be used to sound the attack band the infantry trumpets to sound the retreat as they sound very differently. When the Goths tried to ambush the Byzantines again the infantry trumpets sounded and the Byzantines retreated before the ambushing Goths could inflict major losses. This allowed the Byzantines to keep skirmishing with the foraging parties without being annihilated.

With the city starving the defenders sent desperate pleas to Witigis who promised to move to their assistance but failed to do so for the time being, probably due to a supply shortage due to widespread crop failure due to the war.

External situation
At this point the Franks invaded Italy and attack both the Goths and the Byzantines who both thought they moved to their assistance. The Goths suffered far worse from these attacks than the Byzantines. Eventually the Franks retreated because of threats from the Byzantines, a supply shortage and disease which killed up to one third of their force. Around the same time the Huns invaded the empire reaching Constantinople before retreating. A second invasion occurred shortly afterwards, bypassing Byzantine resistance and plundering all of Greece except the Peloponnese. The Persian shah, Khosrow, began intentionally deteriorating Byzantine-Sassanian relations in order to start war. Diplomats sent by the Ostrogoths also arrived in Persia to request the shah to start hostilities with the empire. Recognising these treats the Byzantines tried to make peace with the Goths, their military position in Italy lost priority.

Secret correspondence with Witigis
The Frankish invasion made it impossible for Witigis to support Auximus. The garrison, not having heard of the invasion sent a bribed Byzantine from Narses’ (not the eunuch, another commander named Narses) command to set up correspondence with Witigis. Witigis informed the garrison that he would move as soon as the Franks had fully retreated from Italian soil. Shortly after the garrison sent another message saipying they would have to surrender in 5 days, Witigis again replied that he would some move to their aid. 

Belisarius did not understand how the Goths resisted that long without surrendering and ordered a Goth to be captured and questioned. Discovering the identity of the messenger Belisarius handed him over to his comrades for punishment who burned him alive.

Attack on the water supply
Growing impatient, Belisarius sent an attack to the nearby spring. The spring was located outside of the city but through an underground entrance it supplied the city with water. A wall of shields was used to bring 5 Isaurians to the spring. The Goths thought the Byzantines wanted to storm the wall so they held their fire to let the Byzantines get closer but when they noticed the actual goal they rained down projectiles onto the Byzantines. In a desperate move the Goths launched a sortie, Belisarius ordered his men to attack them. The Byzantines attack uphill and suffered gigantic losses until 7 men from Narses’ command broke through the Gothic lines, possibly fighting harder as to repair their image after the messaging affair. The Byzantines advanced through the gap and drove the Goths back into the city but also retreated themselves afterwards. The Isaurians also retreated, because of superior building techniques used in ancient times the cistern leading water into the city remained intact. In the end the attack was a failure with heavy casualties on the Byzantine side.

Belisarius now saw the importance of the spring and ordered it to be poisoned with carcasses and lime. The defenders now only got water from a small well inside the city but despite a water shortage they held out.

Negotiations and Surrender 

Now the Byzantine commanders Cyprian and Justinus were victorious in the Siege of Fisula and moved to reinforce Belisarius at Auximus. The leaders of the Fisula garrison were paraded outside the city and the garrison began to negotiate with Belisarius. Initially they demanded to be set free and allowed to leave for Ravenna with all their belongings. Belisarius rejected this as he wanted to move of Ravenna next and he did not want to face these troops who had fought so valiantly again. However Belisarius also wanted to take the city with speed as he could not move of Ravenna with a secure rear without taking the city and wanted to attack Ravenna before the Goths could make a new alliance with the Franks and it was near to the end of the campaigning season. The Byzantine troops demanded plunder so both of the Gothic demands were impossible. Belisarius was unsure of what action to take but eventually a compromise was reached whereby half of the garrison's property would be rewarded to the Byzantine troops, the Goths keeping the rest, and the Goths would join the Byzantine army instead of returning to Witigis. After 7 months the siege was finally over.

Aftermath 
Either in late 539 or 540 Belisarius moved against Ravenna, with a secure rear. By chance Byzantine forces under Vitalius approaching the city from north via the Balkan's ran into the grain shipment for the city. Belisarius eventually took the city with a diplomatic deception. By 540 the invasion was over but a plague in the empire and Persian invasion would weaken imperial power and reignite Gothic resistance.

References 

539
Auximus
Gothic War (535–554)
AUximus
Auximus
Auximus
Osimo